Enric Bernat may refer:

 Enric Bernat (businessman) (1923–2003), Spanish businessman and founder of the Chupa Chups lollipop company
 Enric Bernat (footballer) (born 1997), Spanish footballer